Vejle Sygehus railway halt is a railway halt serving the northern part of the city of Vejle in Jutland, Denmark, as well as the nearby hospital Vejle Sygehus.

Vejle Sygehus railway halt is located on the Vejle–Holstebro railway line. The station opened in 1993 to serve the adjacent hospital Vejle Sygehus. The station offers direct InterCityLyn services to Copenhagen and Struer operated by the railway company DSB as well as regional train services to Vejle, Herning and Struer operated by Arriva.

References

Bibliography

External links

 Banedanmark – government agency responsible for maintenance and traffic control of most of the Danish railway network
 DSB – largest Danish train operating company
 Arriva – British multinational public transport company operating bus and train services in Denmark
 Danske Jernbaner – website with information on railway history in Denmark

Railway stations opened in 1993
Railway stations in the Region of Southern Denmark
Railway stations in Denmark opened in the 20th century